Willy Rathnov (13 May 1937 – 29 August 1999) was a Danish film actor. He appeared in 32 films between 1960 and 1988. He was born in Roskilde, Denmark and died in Denmark.

Selected filmography
 Onkel Joakims hemmelighed (1967)
 Soldaterkammerater på bjørnetjeneste (1968)
 Fun in the Streets (1969)
 The Egborg Girl (1969)
 Tough Guys of the Prairie (1970)
 Gold for the Tough Guys of the Prairie (1971)
 The Double Man (1976)

References

External links

1937 births
1999 deaths
Danish male film actors
People from Roskilde
20th-century Danish male actors